Hydrocanthus is a genus of beetles in the family Noteridae, containing the following species:

 ‡Hydrocanthus acrobeles Guignot, 1953
 ‡Hydrocanthus adrasus Guignot, 1950
 Hydrocanthus advena Sharp, 1882
 ‡Hydrocanthus alter Guignot, 1959
 Hydrocanthus ancus Guignot, 1942
 Hydrocanthus atripennis Say, 1830
 ‡Hydrocanthus australasiae Wehncke, 1876
 ‡Hydrocanthus balkei Toledo & Hendrich 2006
 ‡Hydrocanthus carbonarius Guignot, 1936 - This species was not included in Nilsson's revised catalogue of 2011.
 ‡Hydrocanthus colini Zimmermann, 1926
 ‡Hydrocanthus congoanus Gschwendtner, 1930
 ‡Hydrocanthus congrex Guignot, 1959
 ‡Hydrocanthus consimilis Gschwendtner, 1938
 ‡Hydrocanthus constrictus Régimbart, 1895
 Hydrocanthus debilis Sharp, 1882
 ‡Hydrocanthus delphinus Guignot, 1942
 ‡Hydrocanthus fabiennae Bameul, 1994
 Hydrocanthus fasciatus Steinheil, 1869
 ‡Hydrocanthus ferruginicollis Régimbart, 1895
 ‡Hydrocanthus funebris Fairmaire, 1869
 ‡Hydrocanthus gracilis H.J.Kolbe, 1883
 ‡Hydrocanthus grandis (Laporte, 1835)
 Hydrocanthus guignoti Young, 1985
 ‡Hydrocanthus impunctatus Gschwendtner, 1932
 ‡Hydrocanthus indicus Wehncke, 1876
 ‡Hydrocanthus insolitus Bilardo & Rocchi, 1987
 Hydrocanthus iricolor Say, 1823
 ‡Hydrocanthus klarae Gschwendtner, 1930
 ‡Hydrocanthus leleupi Guignot, 1955
 Hydrocanthus levigatus (Brullé, 1837)
 Hydrocanthus marmoratus Sharp, 1882
 ‡Hydrocanthus micans Wehncke, 1883
 ‡Hydrocanthus mocquerysi Régimbart, 1895
 Hydrocanthus oblongus Sharp, 1882
 Hydrocanthus occidentalis Young, 1985
 Hydrocanthus pallisteri Young, 1985
 ‡Hydrocanthus paludicola Guignot, 1951
 Hydrocanthus paludimonstrus K.B.Miller, 2001
 Hydrocanthus paraguayensis Zimmermann, 1928
 ‡Hydrocanthus parvulus Gschwendtner, 1930
 ‡Hydrocanthus pederzanii Toledo & Hendrich, 2006
 ‡Hydrocanthus prolixus Sharp, 1904
 Hydrocanthus regius Young, 1953
 Hydrocanthus rubiginosus Guignot, 1942
 ‡Hydrocanthus secutor Guignot, 1955
 Hydrocanthus sharpi Zimmermann, 1928
 ‡Hydrocanthus sicarius Guignot, 1947
 Hydrocanthus socius R.F.Sahlberg, 1844
 ‡Hydrocanthus subplanatus Gschwendtner, 1933
 ‡Hydrocanthus upembicus Guignot, 1954
 ‡Hydrocanthus vadoni Guignot, 1936
 ‡Hydrocanthus waterhousei Blackburn, 1888
 ‡Hydrocanthus wittei Gschwendtner, 1930

In 2016, Baca et al. split this genus into two, reviving the subgeneric name Sternocanthus Guignot, 1948 and elevating it to the rank of genus. The species which were transferred to that genus are indicated with the symbol ‡.

References

Noteridae
Adephaga genera